Sustanon may refer to:

 Testosterone propionate/testosterone phenylpropionate/testosterone isocaproate/testosterone decanoate (Sustanon 250)
 Testosterone propionate/testosterone phenylpropionate/testosterone isocaproate (Sustanon 100)